Rainbichl (Tyrlaching) is a mountain of Bavaria, Germany.

Mountains of Bavaria
Altötting (district)